Paramilionia is a monotypic moth genus in the family Geometridae. At present there is only one species in this genus: Paramilionia rubroplagata, described from Sierra Leone. Although, there are some doubts about the labels of the types and this is possibly a synonym of the South American Sangala gloriosa. Both the genus and species were first described by George Thomas Bethune-Baker in 1906.

It has a wingspan of 50 mm. The wings are blackish, with a strong deep blue metallic lustre.

References

Ennominae
Monotypic moth genera